GURPS Humanx is a sourcebook for GURPS.

Contents
GURPS Humanx is a GURPS supplement of science-fiction role-playing rules set in an interstellar commonwealth of humans and the Thranx, allied insectoid aliens. The book covers character rules for nine alien races, basic psionics, spacecraft and equipment. "The Commonwealth Gazetteer" section describes the inhabited planets, their cultures, and history.  The book also includes statistics for characters from Foster's Humanx Commonwealth stories, and a scenario set in Drallar, on the world of Moth.

Publication history
GURPS Humanx: Roleplaying in Alan Dean Foster's Humanx Commonwealth was written by Curtis M. Scott with Mary Scot and J. David George, with a cover by Michael Whelan, and was first published by Steve Jackson Games in 1987 as a 96-page book. Whalen's cover art was taken from the Ballantine Books edition of Nor Crystal Tears.

Reception

References

GURPS 1st/2nd edition
Humanx
Role-playing game supplements introduced in 1987
Role-playing games based on novels
Space opera role-playing games